The Hamawand is a Kurdish tribe in Kurdistan Region. In 1908 they rebelled against the Ottoman Empire. During the Iraqi Civil War (2014–2017), they fought against the Islamic State of Iraq and the Levant alongside other Kurdish tribes.

Leaders
Jwamer Aga (death 1888)

References

Kurdish tribes